Rui is a Portuguese male first name, also spelled Ruy. It has the same origin as Roderick and Rodrick. It is also a unisex name in Japan. Notable people with the name include:

Ruy de Carvalho (born 1927), Portuguese actor
Rui Barbosa (1849–1923), Brazilian diplomat, writer, jurist, and politician
Rui Campos (1922–2002), Brazilian footballer
Rui Correia (born 1967), Portuguese football goalkeeper
Rui Costa (born 1972), Portuguese football midfielder
Rui da Gracia (born 1985), Spanish-born naturalized Equatoguinean football defender, known mononymously as Rui
Rui de Figueiredo (1929–2013), professor, engineer and mathematician
Rui de Pina (1440–1521), Portuguese chronicler
Rui Falcão (born 1943), Brazilian politician
Rui Faria (born 1979), Portuguese football coach
Rui Gomes (disambiguation), several people
Rui Jorge Faria Azevedo (born 19/80), Portuguese football goalkeeper
Rui Alberto Faria da Costa (born 1986), Portuguese cyclist
, Japanese basketball player
Rui Jordão (1952-2019), Portuguese football striker
Rui Jorge (born 1973), Portuguese football back
Rui Machado (born 1984), Portuguese tennis player
Rui Machida (born 1993), Japanese basketball player
Rui Monteiro (born 1977), Cape Verde-born Dutch footballer
Rui Nereu (born 1986), Portuguese football goalkeeper
Rui Oliveira (born 1996), Portuguese cyclist
Rui Patrício (born 1988), Portuguese football goalkeeper
Rui Rio (born 1957), Portuguese politician and former Mayor of Porto (Presidente da Câmara Municipal)
Rui Sasaki (born 1984), glass artist from Japan
Rui Soares (born 1993), Portuguese squash player
, Japanese ice hockey player
Rui Veloso  (born 1957), Portuguese musician. Known to be the father of Portuguese Rock'n Roll

References

Japanese unisex given names
Portuguese masculine given names